Sweden participated in the Eurovision Song Contest 2014 with the song "Undo" written by Fredrik Kempe, David Kreuger and Hamed "K-One" Pirouzpanah. The song was performed by Sanna Nielsen. The Swedish broadcaster Sveriges Television (SVT) organised the national final Melodifestivalen 2014 in order to select the Swedish entry for the 2014 contest in Copenhagen, Denmark. After a six-week-long competition consisting of four heats, a Second Chance round and a final, "Undo" performed by Sanna Nielsen emerged as the winner after achieving the highest score following the combination of votes from eleven international jury groups and a public vote.

Sweden was drawn to compete in the first semi-final of the Eurovision Song Contest which took place on 6 May 2014. Performing during the show in position 4, "Undo" was announced among the top 10 entries of the second semi-final and therefore qualified to compete in the final on 10 May. It was later revealed that Sweden placed second out of the 15 participating countries in the semi-final with 131 points. In the final, Sweden performed in position 13 and placed third out of the 26 participating countries with 218 points.

Background 

Sweden had won the contest on five occasions: in 1974 with the song "Waterloo" performed by ABBA, in 1984 with the song "Diggi-Loo Diggi-Ley" performed by Herreys, in 1991 with the song "Fångad av en stormvind" performed by Carola, in 1999 with the song "Take Me to Your Heaven" performed by Charlotte Nilsson, and in 2012 with the song "Euphoria" performed by Loreen. Following the introduction of semi-finals for the 2004, Sweden's entries, to this point, have featured in every final except for 2010 when the nation failed to qualify. In 2013, Sweden placed fourteenth in the contest with the song "You" performed by Robin Stjernberg.

The Swedish national broadcaster, Sveriges Television (SVT), broadcasts the event within Sweden and organises the selection process for the nation's entry. Since 1959, SVT has organised the annual competition Melodifestivalen in order to select the Swedish entry for the Eurovision Song Contest.

Before Eurovision

Melodifestivalen 2014 

Melodifestivalen 2014 was the Swedish music competition that selected Sweden's entry for the Eurovision Song Contest 2014. 32 competed in a six-week-long process which consisted of four heats on 1, 8, 15 and 22 February 2014, a second chance round on 1 March 2014, and a final on 8 March 2014. The six shows were hosted by Nour El-Refai and Anders Jansson. Eight songs competed in each heat—the top two qualified directly to the final, while the third and fourth placed songs qualified to the second chance round. The bottom four songs in each heat were eliminated from the competition. An additional two songs qualified to the final from the second chance round. The results in the heats and second chance round were determined exclusively by public televoting, while the overall winner of the competition was selected in the final through the combination of a public vote and the votes from eleven international jury groups. Among the competing artists were former Eurovision Song Contest contestants Helena Paparizou who represented Greece in 2001 as part of the duo Antique as well as in 2005 which she won, Martin Stenmarck who represented Sweden in 2005, Andreas Lundstedt (participating as a member of Alcazar) who represented Switzerland in 2006 and Sylvester Schlegel who represented Sweden in 2007 as part of the group The Ark.

Heats and Second Chance round 

The first heat took place on 1 February 2014 at the Malmö Arena in Malmö. "To the End" performed by Yohio and "Songbird" performed by Ellen Benediktson qualified directly to the final, while "Survivor" performed by Helena Paparizou and "Bröder" performed by Linus Svenning qualified to the Second Chance round. "Aleo" performed by Mahan Moin, "Casanova" performed by Elisa Lindström, "Bedroom" performed by Alvaro Estrella, and "Bygdens son" performed by Sylvester Schlegel were eliminated.
The second heat took place on 8 February 2014 at the Cloetta Center in Linköping. "Undo" performed by Sanna Nielsen and "Efter solsken" performed by Panetoz qualified directly to the final, while "När änglarna går hem" performed by Martin Stenmarck and "Love Trigger" performed by J.E.M qualified to the Second Chance round. "Hallelujah" performed by The Refreshments, "Glow" performed by Manda, "I Am Somebody" performed by Pink Pistols, and "Set Yourself Free" performed by Little Great Things were eliminated.
The third heat took place on 15 February 2014 at the Scandinavium in Gothenburg. "Yes We Can" performed by Oscar Zia and "Busy Doin' Nothin'" performed by Ace Wilder qualified directly to the final, while "All We Are" performed by State of Drama and "Echo" performed by Outtrigger qualified to the Second Chance round. "Red" performed by Eko, "Burning Alive" performed by Shirley Clamp, "En enkel sång" performed by CajsaStina Åkerström, and "Around the World" performed by Dr. Alban feat. Jessica Folcker were eliminated.
The fourth heat took place on 22 February 2014 at the Fjällräven Center in Örnsköldsvik. "Blame It on the Disco" performed by Alcazar and "Natural" performed by Anton Ewald qualified directly to the final, while "En himmelsk sång" performed by Ellinore Holmer and "Raise Your Hands" performed by Ammotrack qualified to the Second Chance round. "Fight Me If You Dare" performed by I.D.A, "Hollow" performed by Janet Leon, "Hela natten" performed by Josef Johansson, and "Ta mig" performed by Linda Bengtzing were eliminated.
The Second Chance round (Andra chansen) took place on 1 March 2014 at the Sparbanken Lidköping Arena in Lidköping. "Survivor" performed by Helena Paparizou and "Bröder" performed by Linus Svenning qualified to the final.

Final 
The final was held on 8 March 2014 at the Friends Arena in Stockholm. Ten songs competed—two qualifiers from each of the four preceding heats and two qualifiers from the Second Chance round. The combination of points from a viewer vote and eleven international jury groups determined the winner. The viewers and the juries each had a total of 473 points to award. The nations that comprised the international jury were Denmark, Estonia, France, Germany, Israel, Italy, Malta, the Netherlands, Russia, Spain and The United Kingdom. "Undo" performed by Sanna Nielsen was selected as the winner with 212 points.

At Eurovision 

To ensure fair ticket distribution in the Nordic region for the semi-finals, the Eurovision Reference Group, at the request by the host broadcaster for the 2014 contest DR, held a draw at the European Broadcasting Union headquarters in Geneva in November 2013 where Sweden was drawn to compete in the first semi-final on 6 May 2014. During the semi-final allocation draw on 20 January 2014 at the Copenhagen City Hall, Sweden was drawn to compete in the first half of the first semi-final. In the first semi-final, the producers of the show decided that Sweden would perform 4th, following Estonia and preceding Iceland. Sweden qualified from first semi-final and competed in the final on 10 May 2014. During the winner's press conference for the first semi-final qualifiers, Sweden was allocated to compete in the first half of the final. In the final, the producers of the show decided that Sweden would perform 13th, following Germany and preceding France. Sweden placed 3rd in the final, scoring 218 points.

On stage, Sanna Nielsen was joined by five backing vocalists: Britta Bergström, Jeanette Ohlsson, Thérèse Löf Amberg, Dea Norberg and Jessica Marberger. The Swedish performance focused on Sanna alone on stage surrounded by lights which eventually shone on a large glitter ball on the ceiling.

In Sweden, both the semi-finals and the final were broadcast on SVT1 with commentary by Malin Olsson and Edward af Sillén. The shows were also broadcast via radio on Sveriges Radio P4 with commentary by Carolina Norén and Ronnie Ritterland. The Swedish spokespersons revealing the result of the Swedish vote in the final was Alcazar.

Voting

Points awarded to Sweden

Points awarded by Sweden

Detailed voting results
The following members comprised the Swedish jury:
 Michael Cederberg (jury chairperson)playlist manager P3 radio, radio host
 Robert Sehlbergmusic director at RIX FM radio
 Oscar Ziasinger
 dancer, choreographer, creative director
 Elli Flemströmartist, member of J.E.M

References

2014
Countries in the Eurovision Song Contest 2014
Eurovision
Eurovision